This list is of the Cultural Properties of Japan designated in the category of  for the Prefecture of Nara.

National Cultural Properties
As of 1 November 2015, two hundred and sixty-three Important Cultural Properties (including sixty-four *National Treasure) with three hundred and eight-four (*seventy-one) component structures have been designated, being of national significance.

Prefectural Cultural Properties
As of 1 May 2015, one hundred and sixteen properties with one hundred and eighty-eight component structures have been designated at a prefectural level.

Municipal Cultural Properties
As of 1 May 2015, eighty properties with one hundred and six component structures have been designated at a municipal level.

Registered Cultural Properties
As of 1 November 2015, two hundred and eighteen properties have been registered (as opposed to designated) at a national level.

See also
 Cultural Properties of Japan
 National Treasures of Japan
 List of Historic Sites of Japan (Nara)
 Nara National Museum
 List of Cultural Properties of Japan - paintings (Nara)

References

External links
  Cultural Properties in Nara Prefecture

Cultural Properties,Nara
Buildings and structures in Nara Prefecture
Nara
Structures,Nara